Nepal participated in the 2014 Asian Beach Games which were held in Phuket, Thailand  14 to 23 November 2014.

Medal summary

Medal by sport

Medal by Date

External links 
Official Site

References 

Nations at the 2014 Asian Beach Games
2014
Asian Beach Games